Pauline Moran (born 26 August 1947) is an English actress, presenter, and astrologer, best known for her role as Miss Felicity Lemon in the British television series Agatha Christie's Poirot.

She trained at several schools, including the National Youth Theatre and the Royal Academy of Dramatic Art. She has also been a professional astrologer since 1987. Although primarily a stage actress, Moran has appeared in films such as The Good Soldier (1981), The Woman in Black (1989), Byron (2003) and A Little Chaos (2014), as well as the 1983 television series The Cleopatras. From 1965 to about 1970, she played bass guitar in the all-female band The She Trinity.

References

External links
 

20th-century English actresses
21st-century English actresses
Alumni of RADA
English film actresses
English bass guitarists
English stage actresses
English television actresses
English astrologers
20th-century astrologers
21st-century astrologers
Women bass guitarists
People from Blackpool
Living people
1947 births
Musicians from Lancashire
Actresses from Lancashire
National Youth Theatre members